Andrew Anthony is a journalist who has written for The Guardian since 1990, and The Observer.

Published works
On Penalties (Yellow Jersey Press, 2000)
The Fall-Out: How a Guilty Liberal Lost His Innocence (Jonathan Cape, 2007)

References

External links
Profile at The Guardian
Anthony Andrew's page on Randomhouse.co.nz

Year of birth missing (living people)
Living people
The Guardian journalists
British journalists